Sindarius Thornwell (born November 15, 1994) is an American professional basketball player who last played for Frutti Extra Bursaspor of the Turkish Basketbol Süper Ligi (BSL). He played college basketball for the South Carolina Gamecocks. Thornwell was selected by the Milwaukee Bucks with the 48th overall pick in the 2017 NBA draft before he was traded to the Los Angeles Clippers.

High school career
Thornwell attended Lancaster High School in Lancaster, South Carolina for his first three years of high school. He then transferred to Oak Hill Academy for his senior year where he averaged 26.8 points per game and averaged 8.6 rebounds and 3.6 assists as well. He led them to a 33–5 record. He was ranked as the 39th-best player by ESPN.com and a four-star recruit by Rivals.com, who also ranked him as the 11th-best shooting guard in his class. He also competed in the 2012 Nike Global Challenge playing in four games.

|}

College career
After committing to South Carolina on October 2, 2012, Thornwell was second on the South Carolina basketball team in scoring with 13.4 ppg and 4.0 rebounds per game. He also averaged 3.0 assists per game. During conference play, he was averaging 15.0 ppg as well. On January 22, 2014, Thornwell had a career-high 26 points against the University of Georgia. As a result of his production that season, Thornwell was named a member of the All-SEC Freshman Team.

His sophomore year in the 2014–15 season was not as productive as his freshman season.

His junior year, on the other hand, would provide relatively similar results to what he had in his freshman year.

However, it would be his senior season where Thornwell would come into his own as a player, as Thornwell would average 21.4 points, 7.2 rebounds and 2.2 steals in 34.2 minutes of action per game. As a result of his production that season, he was not only a member of the All-SEC First Team, but he was also named the SEC Player of the Year thanks to votes from the coaches of the Southeastern Conference. Furthermore, Thornwell would be the main leader to help the No. 7 seeded South Carolina proceed all the way to the Final Four in the 2017 NCAA tournament, which was the highest results in South Carolina's history.

Professional career

Los Angeles Clippers (2017–2019)
On June 22, 2017, Thornwell was selected with the 48th pick in the 2017 NBA draft by the Milwaukee Bucks, but his draft rights were then traded to the Los Angeles Clippers. Thornwell signed with the Clippers on July 26.

Rio Grande Valley Vipers (2019–2020)
On August 4, 2019, Thornwell signed with the Cleveland Cavaliers and played in three preseason games before he was waived on October 16.
 
On October 26, 2019, the Canton Charge traded Thornwell to the Rio Grande Valley Vipers for a first-round G-League pick in 2020. Thornwell averaged 9.2 points, 5.2 rebounds and 4.6 assists per game on 42.9 percent shooting in the 2019–20 season.

New Orleans Pelicans (2020–2021)
On July 6, 2020, Thornwell was signed by the New Orleans Pelicans as a substitute player for the remainder of the 2019–20 season. On December 1, he re-signed with the Pelicans.

After waiving Thornwell on February 23, 2021, the Pelicans signed him to a 10-day contract the next day. On March 10, he was signed to a second 10-day contract.

Orlando Magic (2021)
On May 4, 2021, Thornwell signed a two-way contract with the Orlando Magic. He averaged 3.4 points, 1.9 rebounds, 2.4 assists and 1.1 steals per game in seven games played.

ratiopharm Ulm (2021–2022)
On November 11, 2021, Thornwell signed with ratiopharm Ulm of the German Basketball Bundesliga.

Thornwell joined the Chicago Bulls for the 2022 NBA Summer League.

Frutti Extra Bursaspor (2022)
On October 19, 2022, he has signed with Frutti Extra Bursaspor of the Turkish Basketbol Süper Ligi (BSL).

Career statistics

NBA

Regular season

|-
| style="text-align:left;"|
| style="text-align:left;"|L.A. Clippers
| 73 || 17 || 15.8 || .429 || .377 || .670 || 1.9 || .9 || .7 || .3 || 3.9
|-
| style="text-align:left;"|
| style="text-align:left;"|L.A. Clippers
| 64 || 1 || 4.9 || .347 || .200 || .735 || .7 || .3 || .2 || .1 || 1.0
|-
| style="text-align:left;"|
| style="text-align:left;"|New Orleans
| 2 || 0 || 17.5 || .545 || .500 || .500 || 2.0 || 2.0 || .5 || .5 || 8.0
|-
| style="text-align:left;" rowspan="2"| 
| style="text-align:left;"| New Orleans
| 14 || 1 || 5.2 || .333 || .333 || .000 || .4 || .3 || .4 || .1 || 1.2
|-
| style="text-align:left;"| Orlando
| 7 || 0 || 20.6 || .320 || .286 || .667 || 1.9 || 2.4 || 1.1 || .1 || 3.4
|- class="sortbottom"
| style="text-align:center;" colspan="2"|Career
| 160 || 19 || 10.8 || .407 || .340 || .672 || 1.3 || .7 || .5 || .2 || 2.5

Playoffs

|-
| style="text-align:left;"|2019
| style="text-align:left;"|L.A. Clippers
| 4 || 0 || 3.0 || .333 || .333 ||  || 1.0 || .0 || .3 || .0 || 1.3
|-class="sortbottom"
| style="text-align:center;" colspan="2"|Career 
| 4 || 0 || 3.0 || .333 || .333 ||  || 1.0 || .0 || .3 || .0 || 1.3

College

|-
| style="text-align:left;"|2013–14
| style="text-align:left;"|South Carolina
| 34 || 34 || 29.6 || .386 || .370 || .736 || 4.1 || 3.0 || 1.2 || .6 || 13.4
|-
| style="text-align:left;"|2014–15
| style="text-align:left;"|South Carolina
| 33 || 33 || 30.6 || .340 || .268 || .716 || 4.9 || 2.2 || 1.3 || .3 || 11.1
|-
| style="text-align:left;"|2015–16
| style="text-align:left;"|South Carolina
| 34 || 34 || 33.1 || .382 || .333 || .764 || 4.8 || 3.8 || 1.5 || .5 || 13.4
|-
| style="text-align:left;"|2016–17
| style="text-align:left;"|South Carolina
| 31 || 31 || 33.9 || .444 || .392 || .830 || 7.1 || 2.8 || 2.1 || 1.0 || 21.4'''
|- class="sortbottom"
| style="text-align:center;" colspan="2"|Career
| 132 || 132 || 31.8 || .392 || .339 || .771 || 5.2 || 3.0 || 1.5 || .6 || 14.7

References

External links

 South Carolina Gamecocks bio

1994 births
Living people
21st-century African-American sportspeople
African-American basketball players
Agua Caliente Clippers players
American expatriate basketball people in Germany
American men's basketball players
Basketball players from South Carolina
Bursaspor Basketbol players
Los Angeles Clippers players
Milwaukee Bucks draft picks
New Orleans Pelicans players
Orlando Magic players
People from Lancaster, South Carolina
Ratiopharm Ulm players
Point guards
Rio Grande Valley Vipers players
Shooting guards
South Carolina Gamecocks men's basketball players